George "Guv" S. Musulin (April 9, 1914 – February 23, 1987) was an American army officer of the Office of Strategic Services (OSS) who in 1950 became a CIA operative.

Early life
George Musulin was born into a Serbian family in New York City and grew up in Johnstown, Pennsylvania. He graduated from the University of Pittsburgh, where he played with the university's football team during their national championship year of 1937. After college he played professional American football in Pittsburgh, St. Louis and Chicago.

Second World War
Musulin became a captain in the OSS during the Second World War. In mid-October 1943, Musulin, as part of a U.S. military mission, parachuted into Yugoslavia to the headquarters of General Draža Mihailović. In January 1944 Musulin was a delegate on the Ba Congress organized by Draža Mihailović.

On 29 May 1944, Musulin, aided by Chetniks, was evacuated along with the British and American mission and 40 rescued Allied airmen to Bari, leaving General Mihailović without support. In Bari Musulin proposed another rescue of American airmen shot down over Yugoslavia. He again parachuted into Chetnik territory, near the village of Pranjani, where there were several hundred American airmen rescued by Chetnik forces and hidden from the Germans. Musulin successfully commanded the airlift Operation Halyard, the rescue from the air of about 447 U.S. airmen from Nazi-occupied Yugoslavia, from 10 to 29 August 1944. Although this operation was successful due to cooperation from General Mihailović, Musulin had been ordered not to give the Chetniks political promises, an order he violated when he allowed members of General Mihailović's political mission to board the plane. At this time the British were the main Allied authority in the Mediterranean, and their Special Operations Executive (SOE) complained to Musulin's superiors in the OSS, who decided to expel him from the service. In late 1944 Musulin was transferred to the Far East as part of the naval intelligence service, where he stayed until the end of the war.

Post war years
After the war  the CIA conducted its own investigation into Musulin, which concluded that he had acted appropriately and that he had been the victim of James Klugmann and other British agents in the SOE with communist sympathies. For his efforts, Musulin was awarded the Legion of Merit.

Musulin enlisted in the Office of Naval Intelligence and joined the Central Intelligence Agency in 1950, where he remained until he retired in 1974. Musulin continued to serve as a field operations officer. He was part of a team that was responsible for recruiting and training Cuban exiles to fight against the regime of Fidel Castro. He was disappointed with the failure of the Bay of Pigs Invasion and the loss of human life.

Musulin died of complications of diabetes at the age of 72.

See also
 Operation Halyard
 George Vujnovich
 Michael Rajacich
 Robert H. McDowell
 Joe Veselinovich
 Mike Divjak
 Michael Boro Petrovich
 Eli Popovich

References

Sources

External links

THE O.S.S. SOCIETY, INC, Spring 2005.
The O.S.S. Society, Newsletter, Summer/Fall 2007.
gregoryafreeman.com

1914 births
1987 deaths
People of the Office of Strategic Services
American people of Serbian descent
People of the Central Intelligence Agency
Recipients of the Legion of Merit
Chetniks